Marty Riessen and Sherwood Stewart were the defending champions, but lost in the final this year.

Victor Amaya and Hank Pfister won the title, defeating Riessen and Stewart 6–3, 3–6, 7–6(7–2) in the final.

Seeds

Draw

Draw

External links
Draw

Tokyo Indoor
1980 Grand Prix (tennis)